Edward Francis McSweeney (10 September 1903 – 7 March 1972) was an Australian rules footballer who played with Essendon in the Victorian Football League (VFL).

Notes

External links 

1903 births
1972 deaths
Australian rules footballers from Melbourne
Essendon Football Club players
People from North Melbourne